Matchmaking is the process of matching two or more people together, usually for the purpose of marriage, in which case the matchmaker is also known as a marriage broker. The word is also used in the context of sporting events such as boxing, in business, in online video games and in pairing organ donors.

Practice

These services often rely on personality tests (but genetics has even been proposed), aiming to maximize the identification of the best match.

The acceptance of dating systems, however, has created something of a resurgence in the role of the traditional professional matchmaker. Those who find dating systems or services useful but prefer human intelligence and personal touches can choose from a wide range of such services now available. According to Mark Brooks (an online personal and social networking expert), "you can actually find people who are compatible, and this is a major advance that is going to keep the industry alive for the upcoming 50 years". He also stated that matchmakers offer "a chance to connect" and "a chance to authenticate" prospects in ways the websites can’t.

In some cultures, the role of the matchmaker was and is quite professionalised. The Ashkenazi Jewish shadchan, or the Hindu astrologer, were often thought to be essential advisors and also helped in finding right spouses as they had links and a relation of good faith with the families. In cultures where arranged marriages were the rule, the astrologer often claimed that the stars sanctified matches that both parents approved of, making it quite difficult for the possibly-hesitant children to easily object – and also making it easy for the astrologer to collect his fee.  Tarot divination has also been employed by some matchmakers.

Social dance, especially in frontier North America, the contra dance and square dance, has also been employed in matchmaking, usually informally. However, when farming families were widely separated and kept all children on the farm working, marriage-age children could often only meet in church or in such mandated social events. Matchmakers, acting as formal chaperones or as self-employed 'busybodies' serving less clear social purposes, would attend such events and advise families of any burgeoning romances before they went too far.

The influence of such people in a culture that did not arrange marriages, and in which economic relationships (e.g. "being able to support a family", "good prospects") played a larger role in determining if a (male) suitor was acceptable, is difficult to determine. It may be fair to say only that they were able to speed up, or slow down, relationships that were already forming. In this sense they were probably not distinguishable from relatives, rivals, or others with an interest. Clergy probably played a key role in most Western cultures, as they continue to do in modern ones, especially where they are the most trusted mediators in the society. Matchmaking was certainly one of the peripheral functions of the village priest in Medieval Catholic society, as well as a duty of rabbis in traditional Jewish communities. Today, the shidduch is a system of matchmaking in which Jewish singles are introduced to one another in Orthodox Jewish communities.

In Asia
In Singapore, the Social Development Unit (SDU), run by the city-state's government, offers a combination of professional counsel and dating system technology, like many commercial dating services.  Thus the role of the matchmaker has become institutionalized, as a bureaucrat, and every citizen in Singapore has access to some subset of the matchmaking services that were once reserved for royalty or upper classes.

Other uses 
The concept of matchmaking is also used in the business world and is known as B2B Matchmaking, Investor Matchmaking, Business Speed Dating, or Brokerage Events. In contradiction to social networking solutions, real meetings between business people are in focus. Trade fair organisations e.g. find this concept an added value for their exhibitors because it gives them the opportunity of advanced planned meetings. Following the inspiration of dating sites, some online B2B networking platforms developed advanced business matching solutions enabling relevant business partners' identification.

See also 

 Anonymous matching
 Dating agency
 Genetic matchmaking
 Collaborative filtering
 Mail-order bride
 Marriage market
 Matrimonial website
 The old man under the moon: fabled Chinese matchmaker
 Pattern matching
 Novertur: Business matchmaking platform
 Khatbas: Traditional Egyptian matchmakers

People
 Robert Stewart Sparks, Los Angeles City Hall matchmaker, 20th century
 Nelle Brooke Stull, founder and president of the Widows' & Widowers' Club, 20th century

References

External links